Nadie dijo nada, (AKA: Nessuno disse niente)()  is a 1971 Chilean-Italian comedy film directed by Raúl Ruiz.

Cast
 Carlos Solanos - Waldo Martínez
 Jaime Vadell - Germán
 Luis Vilches - Tomás
 Luis Alarcón - The poet
 Nelson Villagra - Tony Ventura
 Shenda Román - Elsa
 Pedro Gaete - God
 Humberto Miranda - Suicide
 Carla Cristi - Abandoned mother
 Carmen Lara - Abandoned wife

References

External links
 

1971 films
1970s Spanish-language films
1971 comedy films
Films directed by Raúl Ruiz
Chilean comedy films